AD 31 (XXXI) was a common year starting on Monday (link will display the full calendar) of the Julian calendar. At the time, it was known as the Year of the Consulship of Tiberius and Sejanus (or, less frequently, year 784 Ab urbe condita). The denomination AD 31 for this year has been used since the early medieval period, when the Anno Domini calendar era became the prevalent method in Europe for naming years.

Events

By place

Roman Empire 
 6 April (Good Friday) – Jesus is crucified (according to one dating scheme).   He is later reported alive by his disciples.
 Lucius Aelius Sejanus is named co-Consul to Emperor Tiberius.  However, Tiberius becomes aware of Sejanus' treachery and has him arrested and executed.
 Naevius Sutorius Macro becomes the leader of the Praetorian Guard after Sejanus is executed.

Births 
Gnaeus Arrius Antoninus, Roman consul
Musonius Rufus, Roman Stoic philosopher (d. 101)

Deaths 
 April 6 – Jesus of Nazareth, (possible date of the crucifixion) (born circa 4 BC) The other possible dates also supported by scholarly consensus among a survey of 100 published scholarly biblical statements are April 7, AD 30 and April 3, AD 33.
 April 27 Jesus Crucified according to a Chodesh calculating system see http://www.chodesh.info/nmoon/finding-the-historical-crucifixion-date.htm
 October 18 – Lucius Aelius Sejanus, Roman prefect and advisor (b. 20 BC)
 Claudia Livia Julia, niece and daughter-in-law of Tiberius (b. 13 BC)
 Marcus Velleius Paterculus, Roman historian and writer (b. c. 19 BC)
 Nero Julius Caesar Germanicus, grandson and heir of Tiberius (b. AD 6)

References 

0031

als:30er#31